Julien Lizeroux (born 5 September 1979) is a retired French World Cup alpine ski racer. He competed mainly in slalom, but also in giant slalom and combined.

Born in Moûtiers, Savoie, Lizeroux is a member of Douanes-La Plagne. He made his World Cup debut in 2000 and has three World Cup victories, all in slalom. Lizeroux won silver medals in the super combined and the slalom on home snow at the 2009 World Championships in Val d'Isère. He finished 9th in the slalom and 18th in the super combined of the 2010 Winter Olympics in Vancouver.

A problematic right knee hampered his performance during the first half of 2011 season, and has sidelined him since January 2011. Surgery in June 2011 caused Lizeroux to miss the 2012 season.

He returned for the 2014 season, without much success. The following three seasons (2015–2017) were more successful, with several (one, five and five, respectively) finishes in the top ten. In 2015 he got into world news for a mistake in a slalom race. In 2017 he became world champion in team event (as a reserve). Lizeroux retired from professional skiing in January 2021.

He is in a relationship with alpine skier Tessa Worley.

World Cup results

Season standings

Race podiums
 3 wins – (3 SL)
 9 podiums – (7 SL, 1 SC, 1 CE(PS))

Olympic results

World Championships results

References

External links

Julien Lizeroux World Cup standings at the International Ski Federation

 
French Ski Team – 2012 men's A team – 
Dynastar.com – athletes – Julien Lizeroux
Lange Ski Boots – team – Julien Lizeroux

1979 births
Living people
Sportspeople from Savoie
French male alpine skiers
Olympic alpine skiers of France
Alpine skiers at the 2010 Winter Olympics
Alpine skiers at the 2014 Winter Olympics
Alpine skiers at the 2018 Winter Olympics
21st-century French people